Nes is a former municipality in the old Sør-Trøndelag county, Norway. The municipality existed from 1899 until its dissolution in 1964. The  municipality encompassed the coastal land north of the Bjugnfjorden as well as the Tarva islands in what is now the municipality of Ørland in Trøndelag county. The administrative centre of Nes was the village of Nes where the Nes Church is located.

History

The municipality of Nes was established on 1 January 1899 when the old municipality of Bjugn was split into three separate municipalities: Bjugn (population: 1,256), Skjørn (population: 2,166), and Nes (population: 1,285). During the 1960s, there were many municipal mergers across Norway due to the work of the Schei Committee. On 1 January 1964, the municipality of Nes (population: 1,107) was merged with the neighboring municipalities of Bjugn (population: 1,240), Jøssund (population: 1,917), and the northern part of Stjørna (population: 676) to form a new, larger municipality of Bjugn.

Government
All municipalities in Norway, including Nes, are responsible for primary education (through 10th grade), outpatient health services, senior citizen services, unemployment and other social services, zoning, economic development, and municipal roads. The municipality is governed by a municipal council of elected representatives, which in turn elects a mayor.

Municipal council
The municipal council  of Nes was made up of representatives that were elected to four year terms. The party breakdown of the final municipal council was as follows:

See also
List of former municipalities of Norway

References

Former municipalities of Norway
Ørland
1899 establishments in Norway
1964 disestablishments in Norway